La Miranda is a mountain of the Catalan Pre-Coastal Range in the autonomous community of Catalonia in Spain. It has an elevation of 918 metres above sea level.

It is the second-highest summit of the Serra de Llaberia range. There is a weather radar at the top.

References

Mountains of Catalonia